William H. Daniels ASC (December 1, 1901 – June 14, 1970) was a film cinematographer who was Greta Garbo's personal lensman.  Early in his career he worked regularly with director Erich von Stroheim.

Early years
Daniels was born in Cleveland, Ohio in 1901. He started his film career in 1919.

Career 
His career as a cinematographer extended fifty years from the silent film Foolish Wives (1922) to Move (1970), although he was an uncredited camera operator on two earlier films (1919 and 1920). His major films included The Naked City (1948), filmed on the streets of New York, for which he won an Academy Award for Best Cinematography.

He also was associate producer of a few films in the 1960s and was President of American Society of Cinematographers (1961–63).

Death 
On his death in 1970 in Los Angeles, California, William H. Daniels was interred in the Forest Lawn Memorial Park Cemetery in Glendale, California.

Filmography

 The Devil's Pass Key (1920)
 Foolish Wives (1922)
 Merry-Go-Round (1923)
 Helen's Babies (1924)
 Greed (1924)
 Women and Gold (1925)
 The Merry Widow (1925)
 Dance Madness (1925)
 Torrent (1926)
 The Boob (1926)
 Monte Carlo (1926)
 Money Talks (1926)
 Bardelys the Magnificent (1926)
 The Temptress (1926)
 Altars of Desire (1926)
 Flesh and the Devil (1926)
 Captain Salvation (1927)
 Tillie the Toiler (1927)
 On Ze Boulevard (1927)
 Love (1927)
 The Latest from Paris (1928)
 Bringing Up Father (1928)
 The Actress (1928)
 Telling the World (1928)
 The Mysterious Lady (1928)
 A Woman of Affairs (1928)
 Dream of Love (1928)
 A Lady of Chance (1928)
 Wild Orchids (1928)
 Queen Kelly (1928)
 The Trial of Mary Dugan (1929)
 The Last of Mrs. Cheyney (1929)
 Wise Girls/Kempy (1929)
 The Kiss (1929)
 Their Own Desire (1929)
 Anna Christie (1930)
 Montana Moon (1930)
 Strictly Unconventional (1930)
 Le spectre vert (1930)
 Romance (1930)
 If the Emperor Only Knew That (1930)
 Olympia (1930)
 The Great Meadow (1930)
 Inspiration (1930)
 A Free Soul (1931)
 Susan Lenox (Her Fall and Rise) (1931)
 Mata Hari (1931)
 Lovers Courageous (1931)
 Grand Hotel (1931)
 As You Desire Me (1932)
 Skyscraper Souls (1932)
 Rasputin and the Empress (1932)
 The White Sister (1933)
 The Stranger's Return (1933)
 Dinner at Eight (1933)
 Broadway to Hollywood/Ring Up the Curtain (1933)
 Christopher Bean (1933)
 Queen Christina (1933)
 The Barretts of Wimpole Street (1934)
 The Painted Veil (1934)
 Naughty Marietta (1934)
 Anna Karenina (1935)
 I Live My Life (1935)
 Rendezvous (1935)
 Camille (1936)
 Romeo and Juliet (1936)
 Rose Marie (1936)
 Personal Property (1937)
 Broadway Melody of 1938 (1937)
 Double Wedding (1937)
 The Last Gangster (1937)
 Beg, Borrow or Steal (1937)
 Marie Antoinette (1938)
 The Shopworn Angel (1938)
 Three Loves Has Nancy (1938)
 Dramatic School (1938)
 Idiot's Delight (1938)
 Stronger Than Desire (1939)
 Ninotchka (1939)
 Another Thin Man (1939)
 The Shop Around the Corner (1940)
 The Mortal Storm (1940)
 New Moon (1940)
 So Ends Our Night (1940)
 Back Street (1940)
 Love Crazy (1941)
 They Met in Bombay (1941)
 Honky Tonk (1941)
 Shadow of the Thin Man (1941)
 Design for Scandal (1941)
 Dr. Kildare's Victory (1941)
 For Me and My Gal (1942)
 Keeper of the Flame (1942)
 Girl Crazy (1943)
 The Heavenly Body (1943)
 The Canterville Ghost (1943)
 Maisie Goes to Reno (1944)
 Sure Cures (1946)
 Lured (1947) (aka Personal Column)
 Diamond Demon (1947)
 Brute Force (1947)
 The Naked City (1948)
 For the Love of Mary (1948)
 Family Honeymoon (1948)
 The Life of Riley (1949)
 Illegal Entry (1949)
 The Gal Who Took the West (1949)
 Abandoned (1949)
 Three Came Home (1949)
 Woman in Hiding (1950)
 Winchester '73 (1950)
 Deported (1950)
 Harvey (1950)
 Thunder on the Hill (1950)
 Bright Victory (1951)
 The Lady Pays Off (1951)
 Never Wave at a WAC (1951)
 Glory Alley (1951)
 Pat and Mike (1952)
 Plymouth Adventure (1952)
 Thunder Bay (1952)
 When in Rome (1952)
 The Glenn Miller Story (1953)
 The Far Country (1953)
 War Arrow (1953)
 Forbidden (1953)
 Strategic Air Command (1954)
 Six Bridges to Cross (1954)
 The Shrike (1955)
 Foxfire (1955)
 The Girl Rush (1955)
 The Benny Goodman Story (1955)
 Away All Boats (1956)
 The Unguarded Moment (1956)
 Istanbul (1956)
 Interlude (1956)
 Night Passage (1956)
 My Man Godfrey (1957)
 Voice in the Mirror (1958)
 Cat on a Hot Tin Roof (1958)
 Some Came Running (1958)
 A Stranger in My Arms (1958)
 A Hole in the Head (1958)
 Never So Few (1959)
 Can-Can (1960)
 Ocean's 11 (1960)
 All the Fine Young Cannibals (1960)
 Come September (1961)
 How the West Was Won (1962)
 Billy Rose's Jumbo (1962)
 Dokonjo monogatari - zeni no odori (1963)
 Come Blow Your Horn (1963)
 The Prize (1963)
 Robin and the 7 Hoods (1964)
 Von Ryan's Express (1965)
 Marriage on the Rocks (1965)
 Assault on a Queen (1966)
 In Like Flint (1966)
 Valley of the Dolls (1967)
 The Impossible Years (1968)
 Marlowe (1968)
 The Maltese Bippy (1969)
 Move (1970)

Source:

Accolades
Wins
 Academy Awards: Oscar, Best Cinematography, Black-and-White, for The Naked City; 1949.

Nominated
 Academy Awards: Oscar, Best Cinematography, for Anna Christie;  1930.
 Academy Awards: Oscar, Best Cinematography, Color, for Cat on a Hot Tin Roof; 1959.
 Academy Awards: Oscar, Best Cinematography, Color, How the West Was Won (1962); shared with: Milton Krasner, Charles Lang, Joseph LaShelle; 1964.

References

External links
 .
 .
 William H. Daniels at Film Reference.

1901 births
1970 deaths
American cinematographers
Best Cinematographer Academy Award winners
Burials at Forest Lawn Memorial Park (Glendale)